Blue Raspberry may refer to:
Blue raspberry, a local name used in Prince Edward County, Ontario, Canada, for the cultivar 'Columbian', a hybrid (purple raspberry) of Rubus strigosus and Rubus occidentalis.
Rubus leucodermis (the "blue raspberry" or "whitebark raspberry"), a species of Rubus native to western North America
Blue raspberry flavor, a food and beverage flavoring, often artificially colored blue
Blue Raspberry (singer) (Candi Lindsey) (born 1972), American singer